John Lee Lee (11 December 1802 – 16 August 1874) of Orleigh Court in the parish of Buckland Brewer in Devon, and of Dillington House, near Ilminster in Somerset, was a British Whig politician who was Member of Parliament for Wells in Somerset between 1830 and 1837. He was Sheriff of Somerset in 1845–6.

He was born "John Lee Hanning", the only son and heir of William Hanning (died 1834) of Dillington House, near Ilminster in Somerset by his wife Harriett Lee, daughter of Edward Lee of  Pinhoe, Devon. In 1819 at the age of 17, by the will of his uncle Major Edward Lee (d.17 January 1819) of Orleigh, he inherited several estates including Orleigh. Under the terms of the bequest he adopted the surname Lee by royal licence dated 21 March 1825. He let Orleigh to his brother-in-law William Speke of Jordans near Ilminster (father of the River Nile explorer John Hanning Speke (1827–1864)) and made his own residence at Dillington.

In 1830 he was elected one of the Members of Parliament for Wells, and held the seat until 1837.

Lee married twice. His first marriage was in 1834 to Jessy Edwards-Vaughan (died 1836), the daughter of John Edwards-Vaughan of Rheola who was his fellow MP for Wells from 1830 to 1832. By her he had one son, Vaughan Hanning Vaughan-Lee (1836–1882) who became Conservative MP for West Somerset 1874–82. His second marriage, in 1841, was to Hon. Mary Sophia Hood, daughter of Samuel Hood, 2nd Baron Bridport (1788–1868) by whom he had two sons and two daughters.

He died on 16 August 1874 at the age of 71.

Sources
Jenkins, Terry, biography of John Lee Lee published in The History of Parliament: House of Commons 1820-1832, ed. D.R. Fisher, 2009

References

External links 
 

1802 births
1874 deaths
UK MPs 1830–1831
UK MPs 1831–1832
UK MPs 1832–1835
UK MPs 1835–1837
People from Ilminster
Whig (British political party) MPs for English constituencies